Perversity may refer to:
perversion
Biblical `avon  (עָוֹן), ἁμαρτία, see sin
Intersection homology#Perversities